Emerik Blum (7 August 1911 – 24 June 1984) was a Bosnian Jewish businessman, philanthropist and the founder and first director of one of Southeast Europe's largest conglomerates, Energoinvest. 

He also served as the 26th mayor of Sarajevo from 1981 until 1983.

Biography
He was born to immigrant Hungarian Jewish parents on 7 August 1911 in Sarajevo, Bosnia and Herzegovina, which was then a part of the Austro-Hungarian Empire. He received his Bachelor of Science degree in Electrical Engineering from the University of Prague in 1939. 

After graduating from college, he returned to Sarajevo with his wife Matusija. He was arrested on 23 June 1941 and sent to Ustasha-run concentration camps, including Jasenovac, from where he escaped in 1944.

In 1951 he founded and was the first director of Energoinvest, the largest company in ex-Yugoslavia, which continues working and is headquartered in Sarajevo, Bosnia and Herzegovina. He was Mayor in Ministry of Industry and Mining of BiH, director of "Elektrobih" and "Elektrocentar", general engineer of General direction of Union electric power industry, general director of Directorate for electric power industry of SFRJ (Socialist Federal Republic of Yugoslavia) Government, assistant Minister of electric power industry of SFRJ (Socialist Federal Republic of Yugoslavia), president of Committee for electric power industry, and the mayor of Sarajevo for two years beginning in 1981.

He was a member of the Organizational Committee of the 1984 Winter Olympics, officially known as the XIV Olympic Winter Games, which were held in Sarajevo.

There is a student association in the Czech Republic and a street in Sarajevo (former Beogradska) named after him.

Blum entered a hospital in Fojnica in May 1984, and died there on 24 June 1984, aged 72.

References

External links

1911 births
1984 deaths
Businesspeople from Sarajevo
People from the Condominium of Bosnia and Herzegovina
Bosnia and Herzegovina Ashkenazi Jews
Bosnia and Herzegovina people of Hungarian-Jewish descent
Mayors of Sarajevo
Yugoslav Jews
Yugoslav politicians
Recipients of the Order of the Hero of Socialist Labour